George Robert Bayne Giles (21 December 1913 – 11 July 1973) was a New Zealand track and road cyclist. He was a New Zealand's leading track cyclist of the 1930s and held several national titles in 1936-38: the national sprint, time trial third time in succession, and 10-mile title.

Giles was born in Christchurch where he worked in a cycle shop, then as a barman at a hotel. After being initially overlooked for selection due to his times not being "up to the required standard", he represented New Zealand at the 1936 Summer Olympics at Berlin in the sprint, 1000 m time trial, and in the road race. At the 1938 British Empire Games in Sydney he won the bronze medal in the sprint and placed ninth in the time trial.

He died suddenly in Wanganui on 11 July 1973 aged 59, leaving a wife and four sons.

References

1913 births
1973 deaths
New Zealand male cyclists
Cyclists from Christchurch
Cyclists at the 1936 Summer Olympics
Olympic cyclists of New Zealand
Cyclists at the 1938 British Empire Games
Commonwealth Games bronze medallists for New Zealand
Sportspeople from Whanganui
Commonwealth Games medallists in cycling
20th-century New Zealand people
Medallists at the 1938 British Empire Games